A bucksaw is a hand-powered frame saw similar to bow saw and generally used with a sawbuck to cut logs or firewood to length (bucking). Modern bucksaws usually have a metal frame ("H" or "C"-shaped) and a removable blade with coarse teeth held in tension by the frame. Lightweight portable or foldable models used for camping or back-packing are also available. It is often referred to as a bow saw in the North American hardware market, but that term traditionally refers to a different type of saw with a wooden frame.

Description
A bucksaw is a crosscut saw: it is designed to cut across the grain. The width of the blade is constant from the teeth to the back. It is meant to cut wood fibers that are under tension, and is thick so that it is more difficult to bend on the push stroke. It can be either a one or two-man saw. Coopers often use bucksaws in their work.

Bucksaws can be used for a number of tasks like clearing land, chopping firewood, cutting lumber, and sometimes kept handy for small logging projects. Due to their portability, these hand tools are often preferred by people that like to go camping and enjoy the outdoors lifestyle. Bucksaws feature coarse teeth that allow them to work with very big timber and are designed to allow replacing the blades after extensive woodworking projects.

If people use them for furnishing crafts, the blades can be substituted with more polished ones. The cuts produced with these smaller toothed blades are smoother and cleaner. The advantage of this tool is that electric power (or cord) is not needed to use it, and its affordability makes easily replaceable.

References

External links
Reciprocating Saw

Saws
Logging
Woodworking hand tools